Juan Pablo Carrasco Celis (born 11 August 1992) is a Chilean footballer that currently plays for the Swedish Division 2 Östra Götaland side Husqvarna FF as a forward.

References

External links

Juan Pablo Carrasco at Football Lineups
Juan Pablo Carrasco at playmakerstats.com (English version of ceroacero.es)

1992 births
Living people
People from Rancagua
People from Cachapoal Province
People from O'Higgins Region
Chilean footballers
Chilean expatriate footballers
Association football forwards
O'Higgins F.C. footballers
Puerto Montt footballers
Deportes Valdivia footballers
Husqvarna FF players
Chilean Primera División players
Primera B de Chile players
Segunda División Profesional de Chile players
Division 2 (Swedish football) players
Expatriate footballers in Sweden
Chilean expatriate sportspeople in Sweden